During the 1989–90 English football season, Oldham Athletic A.F.C. competed in the Football League Second Division.

Season summary
Oldham finished in 8th place in the league, missing out on the playoffs by three points. However the club enjoyed excellent form in the cups, reaching the FA Cup Semi-Finals for only the 2nd time in their history, and the Final of the League Cup – and the club's first ever appearance at Wembley.

Results
Home team's score comes first

Legend

Football League Second Division

FA Cup

League Cup

Full Members' Cup

References

1989–90
Oldham Athletic